Nemanja Spasojević (born 8 December 1996) is a Serbian footballer currently playing as a defender for Radnički Sremska Mitrovica.

Career statistics

Club
.

References

1996 births
Living people
Sportspeople from Šabac
Serbian footballers
Association football defenders
Serbian First League players
2. Liga (Slovakia) players
Czech National Football League players
FK Radnički 1923 players
MŠK Rimavská Sobota players
FK Frýdek-Místek players
FC Spartak Trnava players
FK Radnički Pirot players
Xinjiang Tianshan Leopard F.C. players
Serbian expatriate footballers
Serbian expatriate sportspeople in Slovakia
Expatriate footballers in Slovakia
Serbian expatriate sportspeople in the Czech Republic
Expatriate footballers in the Czech Republic
Serbian expatriate sportspeople in China
Expatriate footballers in China